Fábrica Nacional de Munições de Armas Ligeiras, (FNM),, was the national manufacturer of small arms and ammunition in Portugal. It was established in 1947, and closed by the government of Portugal in 2001.

FNM-branded ammunition continued to be sold after the closure of the factory, however it was manufactured by prvi partizan.

References 

Firearm manufacturers of Portugal
Manufacturing companies established in 1947
Manufacturing companies disestablished in 2001
2001 disestablishments in Portugal
Companies based in Lisbon
Portuguese companies established in 1947
Defence companies of Portugal